Face the Music is a musical, the first collaboration between Moss Hart (book) and Irving Berlin (music and lyrics). Face the Music opened on Broadway in 1932, and has had several subsequent regional and New York stagings. The popular song "Let's Have Another Cup of Coffee" was introduced in the musical by J. Harold Murray.

History
The musical was written as a political satire, specifically spoofing political and police corruption that the Seabury Commission was investigating. It also satirized show business, showing the far-fetched economies, such as seeing 4 films with a room and bath for 10¢.  The musical did not ignore the Depression but rather found humor in it.  There were many titles considered, among them Nickels and Dimes, but Berlin came up with the final title.

Synopsis
Producer Hal Reisman desperately seeks backers for his Broadway show. Because of the Great Depression, once-rich investors are "Lunching at the Automat". Kit Baker, a former musical-comedy star and her boyfriend Pat Mason are now out of work and poor ("Let's Have Another Cup of Coffee"). In his search, Reisman meets crooked policemen who need to get rid of their illegal money before they are found out. The corrupt police chief Martin van Buren Meshbesher and his eccentric wife Myrtle become investors in the show, expecting it to be a failure. In the show-within-the-show, Rodney St. Clair sings "My Beautiful Rhinestone Girl".  However, when risqué material is added the show is raided and the government tries to close it. The flop becomes a hit because of the publicity.

Musical numbers
Lunching at the Automat – Ensemble
Let's Have Another Cup of Coffee – Pat Mason, Jr. and Kit Baker 
Torch Song – Streetwalker
You Must Be Born with It – Pickles and Joe	
On a Roof in Manhattan – Pat Mason, Jr. and Kit Baker	
My Beautiful Rhinestone Girl – Rodney St. Clair	
Soft Lights and Sweet Music – Pat Mason, Jr. and Kit Baker
I Say It's Spinach (And the Hell with It) – Pat Mason, Jr. and Kit Baker
A Toast to Prohibition (Drinking Song) – Rodney St. Clair and Boys
Dear Old Crinoline Days (later reprised in the show as "The Nudist Colony" in an attempt to get the show more publicity) – Kit Baker
I Don't Want to Be Married – Pickles and Joe	
Manhattan Madness – Pat Mason, Jr.
Investigation

Added songs
These songs were added in the touring version of the show that was slightly revised, and were restored in the 2007 Encores! production.

Two Cheers Instead of Three- Uncle Sam and Ensemble
The Police Of New York- Policemen
If You Believe- Myrtle Meshbesher and Ensemble
How Can I Change My Luck?- Hal Reisman

Cast

Productions
Face the Music opened in Philadelphia on February 3, 1932, for 2 weeks in its pre-Broadway tryout.

The musical premiered on Broadway at the New Amsterdam Theatre on February 17, 1932, and closed on July 9, 1932, after 165 performances. Staging was by Hassard Short, direction by George S. Kaufman and choreography by Albertina Rasch. It had a return engagement from January 31, 1933, to February 25, 1933, for 31 performances at the 44th Street Theatre (demolished in 1945). The cast featured Mary Boland (Mrs. Meshbesher), J. Harold Murray (Pat Mason, Jr.), Margot Adams (Miss Eisenheimer), Charles Lawrence (Martin van Buren Meshbesher), Robert Emmett Keane (Hal Reisman), Katherine Carrington (Kit Baker), Thomas Arace (Detective), and The Albertina Rasch Dancers.

The 42nd St. Moon (San Francisco) production ran from March 26 - April 13, 1997.
  
The Musicals Tonight! (New York City) production ran in June 2002.

Encores! (New York City) presented a staged concert from March 29 to April 1, 2007. Directed by John Rando with choreography by Randy Skinner, the cast featured Judy Kaye (Mrs. Myrtle Meshbesher), Lee Wilkof (Martin van Buren Meshbesher), Walter Bobbie (Hal Reisman), Eddie Korbich as (Joe Malarky), Jeffry Denman (Pat Mason), and Meredith Patterson (Kit Baker).

'Face the Music' was scheduled for a UK Professional Stage Premiere at the Rose and Crown Theatre from 9 June to 3 July 2015. Directed by Brendan Matthew, choreography by Sally Brooks and musical direction by Aaron Clingham.

Response
Brooks Atkinson, reviewing the original 1932 production for The New York Times, called the musical a "bountiful merry-go-round" of songs and "gibes", writing that it is "bold satire", but has familiar musical comedy numbers, such as the "stunning mirror dance... expressionistic Times Square ballet...and "Dear Old Crinoline Days which is guffawing burlesque."

An unnamed reviewer, quoted in the Brown biography Moss Hart, wrote "It's a worthy successor to Of Thee I Sing [but] it doesn't entirely measure up to it. It resorts to slapstick instead of satire. It becomes merely burlesque. All of which doesn't mean that Face the Music isn't a howl. It most emphatically is."
  
The reviewer for "theatermania.com", in reviewing the "Musicals Tonight!" 2002 production, noted that "1932 audiences didn’t go to musicals for ingenious statire; they wanted sumptuous productions, brilliant choreography, delightful performers, and great songs." The score "boasts two classics ("Soft Lights and Sweet Music" and "Let’s Have Another Cup of Coffee") and much more that's lilting, clever, or otherwise intriguing. One real discovery is "Torch Song," a wicked send-up of Helen Morgan weepers..."Investigation," a 12-minute opera-comique finale that reprises and restates old themes, introduces new ones, wraps up the plot, and brings in a Threepenny Opera-style deus ex machina to usher in the happy ending.

According to the Curtain Up reviewer, commenting on the 2007 Encores! concert, this musical had an "influence on backstage musicals like The Producers, The Drowsy Chaperone and Curtains."

Notes

References
Botto, Louis.  Playbill: At This Theatre (Applause Books, 2002)
Brown, Jared (2006). Moss Hart: A Prince of the Theatre. Back Stage Books. .

External links
 
Face the Music background, musical numbers at The Rodgers and Hammerstein site

Musicals by Irving Berlin
1932 musicals
Broadway musicals